The 2007 Georgia Tech Yellow Jackets football team represented the Georgia Institute of Technology in the 2007 NCAA Division I FBS football season. The team's coach was former Dallas Cowboys, Samford Bulldogs, and Troy Trojans coach Chan Gailey. It played its home games at Bobby Dodd Stadium in Atlanta.

Previous seasons
Georgia Tech had posted five consecutive seasons with 7 or more wins under Coach Gailey. The team had been to five bowl games under Chan Gailey and has a 2–3 record in post season play. Under Chan Gailey, Georgia Tech had become notorious for having a blitzing defense and a ball control offense. In 2006 Georgia Tech proved to be slightly inconsistent holding #2 Notre Dame to 14 points (L 10-14) and upsetting #10 Virginia Tech (W 38–27), while losing to unranked archrival University of Georgia (L 12-15).

Pre-season
Head Coach Chan Gailey returned for his sixth year at the helm of the program. Reggie Ball, after four years starting for Tech, was replaced by Taylor Bennett. Taylor Bennett started his first game against UConn in 2005 after Reggie came down with viral meningitis and had his break out game against West Virginia in the 2007 Gator Bowl. Tashard Choice was the 2006 ACC rushing champion and returned behind a veteran offensive line led by tackle Andrew Gardner and center Kevin Tuminello. Georgia Tech was ranked as high as #14 in the preseason.

Schedule

Game summaries

Notre Dame
Pregame Line: Notre Dame −2.5

Running Back Tashard Choice ran for a career-high 196 yards for 2 touchdowns in the worst loss suffered by Notre Dame in a season opener in its history. Notre Dame accumulated −9 rushing yards and 130 passing yards. Georgia Tech amassed 260 yards on the ground while Taylor Bennett went 11/23 for 121 yards for his third career start. The Georgia Tech defense added nine quarterback sacks and recovered three fumbles.

Samford

Pregame Line: Samford +46.5

Georgia Tech scored 9 rushing touchdowns in an offensive exhibition that also featured 389 yards of rushing yards. Tashard Choice continued his 100 yards per game streak with a 110 yard, 2 touchdown effort.  True freshman Jon Dwyer racked up 3 rushing touchdowns as well.  The Tech defense held Samford to 84 yards rushing and recovered two fumbles.

Boston College
Pregame Line: Boston College +7.5

Georgia Tech hosted Boston College for the first time since 1998, and it was also the first meeting of the two schools since Boston College joined the ACC. Senior BC quarterback Matt Ryan threw for a career-high 435 yards and the Eagles outgained the Jackets 527–267 in the game. Tech's defense held BC to 93 yards rushing, recovered a fumble, and attained two sacks.  Offensive highlights included Jon Dwyer's fifth career touchdown and Demaryius Thomas reeling in 5 catches for 68 yards.  Durant Brooks boomed 10 punts for a 45.3 yard average as well. The loss was Tech's first of the year, dropping them to 2–1, and 0–1 in the ACC.

Virginia
Pregame Line: Virginia +3.5

Tech lost its eighth straight road trip in Charlottesville.  The Jackets gave up 21 points in the first thirteen minutes of the game.  UVA scored two rushing touchdowns and on a Chris Long pass deflection that Taylor Bennett attempted to knock down.  After Bennett attempted to knockdown the pass it was picked off by a UVA linebacker and returned for a touchdown.  Georgia Tech answered back scoring 16 unanswered points to take the lead 23–21 late in the third quarter.  After a muffed punt with nine minutes remaining in the game, UVA took the lead with a touchdown pass, which would be the last score of the game.  Georgia Tech wide receiver Corey Earls suffered a severe nick injury late in the fourth quarter after a Taylor Bennett scramble. Tech was led by Jon Dwyer's 83 yards rushing and Demaryius Thomas' 86 receiving yards and a touchdown.  Tech's defense recovered two fumbles, garnered two sacks, and intercepted one pass.  Safety Jamal Lewis led the team with 12 tackles and a tackle for a loss.

Clemson
Pregame Line: Clemson −3

The Yellow Jackets got their first conference win against rival Clemson.  The Tigers averaged 38 points a game leading up to the contest but only managed a field goal. The Tech defense held C. J. Spiller and James Davis to a combined 62 yards on 21 attempts. The Tech defense also accumulated 6 sacks and an interception in their effort. Tech's Travis Bell kicked two field goals while Clemson's Mark Buchholz missed four of his five attempted field goals. Georgia Tech's offense controlled the clock with a ferocious ground attack, which featured Tashard Choice's 142 rushing yards and a touchdown. Clemson has not scored a touchdown in Bobby Dodd Stadium since 2003. Tech will be on the road for the next two weeks before returning to Atlanta to play the Army Black Knights for the annual homecoming celebration.

Maryland

Pregame Line: Maryland +2.5

Placekicker Travis Bell missed two of four field goal attempts including a 52 yarder on Tech's last possession in a 28–26 loss to Maryland.  Maryland stormed ahead of Tech taking a 21–3 lead by the beginning of the second quarter.  Tech rallied and by the fourth quarter had closed the gap to 2 points on a Taylor Bennett to Demaryius Thomas touchdown pass.  The two-point conversion attempt failed and Tech would not score again.  Tech was led by the rushing of Tashard Choice who carried 32 times for 135 yards and Demaryius Thomas' 9 receptions and 139 yards.  Tech's defense amassed four sacks and recovered a fumble.

Miami
Pregame Line: Miami −2.5

Taylor Bennett scored on two rushing touchdowns in the third quarter to lead Tech past the Hurricanes 17–14.  Tech racked up 265 yards rushing against a Canes defense that only allowed 111 rushing yards per game coming into the contest.  Tashard Choice carried the bulk of the rushing load carrying the ball 37 times for 204 yards.  The Patrick Nix offense of Miami only passed for 56 yards and gained 225 total yards of offense against Jon Tenuta's defense.  Travis Bell kicked the go-ahead field goal with 7:34 left in the fourth quarter and Tech never relented the lead.  Since 1984, only Tech, Virginia Tech, and Florida State have beaten Miami at least 3 years in a row.

Army
Pregame Line: Army +24

Tech beat Army 34–10 at the cost of two running backs.  Tashard Choice and Rashaun Grant were both injured in the contest during Tech's 292-rushing-yard game.  Tech's offense was led by Rashaun Grant's 135 all-purpose yardage and a touchdown.  Tashard Choice, Jamaal Evans, and Jon Dwyer also scored rushing touchdowns.  Mike Cox rushed for a career 38 yards on 3 carries.  Freshman safety Morgan Burnett picked off his third pass of the season, which stymied Army's last attempt at taking the lead for the rest of the game.  Tech's defense recorded 3 total interceptions and 2 sacks.  Senior defensive end Darryl Robertson recorded 4 tackles for losses and a sack in the effort.  Tech was now one victory away from bowl eligibility.

Virginia Tech
Pregame Line: Virginia Tech +2.5

Georgia Tech only mustered a field goal in a game that saw Tech's offense turn the ball over 6 times.  Taylor Bennett threw 4 interceptions and was sacked twice in the effort while freshman quarterback Josh Nesbitt threw another interception in the fourth quarter.  James Johnson accounted for another turnover when he fumbled after a 35 yard reception.  The Tech defense brought pressure all game long and sacked Virginia Tech quarterback Sean Glennon seven times and stripped runningback Branden Ore of the football once in the effort.  James Johnson had 7 receptions for a 136 yards while freshmen Jon Dwyer and Josh Nesbitt carried the load for injured seniors Tashard Choice and Rashaun Grant.  The freshmen pair ran for 101 yards on 14 carries.  Durant Brooks pinned the Hokies inside the twenty 4 times out of 6 punts.  Tech is now eliminated from ACC Title contention.  Also of note, Big Boi of Outkast performed at half-time.

Duke
Pregame Line: Duke +12.5

Georgia Tech prevailed after trailing the Blue Devils 10–7 in the first quarter.  The Tech defense recovered a fumble and recorded eight sacks in the effort.  Tashard Choice eclipsed the 1,000 yard mark for the second straight season with his two touchdown, 174 yard effort.  Tech, with the win, became the 8th bowl eligible team in the ACC and ensured that Georgia Tech's 11 year bowl streak would continue to twelve years.

North Carolina
Pregame Line: North Carolina +10

Georgia Tech survived four lost fumbles to overcome a late UNC rally and win 27–25.  Travis Bell connected on two of three field goal attempts, which included Tech's winning score with 11 seconds remaining in the game.  Taylor Bennett passed for 196 yards, threw for a touchdown, and caught a touchdown pass from Tashard Choice.  Choice added 127 yards on the ground.  The Tech defense added four sacks to the effort led by Gary Guyton who accounted for 8 solo tackles and three tackles for loss.  Durant Brooks punted the ball 4 times for 240 total yards including a booming 76 yard punt.  Tech's 4–4 ACC mark helps Tech finish the season third in the ACC Coastal division and tied for fifth with Wake Forest for fifth overall in the conference.

Georgia
Pregame Line: Georgia −3.5

Tech dropped its seventh straight season finale to UGA with a 31–17 loss.  Tech's defense picked up one sack in the effort.  Tech's offense was led by Tashard Choice's 133 yards and a touchdown.  Durant Brooks boomed four punts for a 52.8 yard average while placekicker Travis Bell knocked down a field goal in the fourth quarter for Tech's last points of the game.

Humanitarian Bowl

Tech was coached by interim head coach Jon Tenuta as head coach Chan Gailey was terminated the Monday after the UGA loss. Tech dropped the decision 40–28.  Tech's only lead of 7–0 held until the Bulldogs scored 27 straight unanswered points.  Tech never recuperated from the 17 point Fresno 2nd quarter as Tech and Fresno exchanged touchdowns for the rest of the game.  Tech highlights included Jon Dwyer rushing for two touchdowns and Demaryius Thomas catching 4 passes for 69 yards and a touchdown.  Tech receiver D.J. Donley blocked his second punt of the year as well.

Postseason awards

Roster

Coaching staff
 Chan Gailey – Head coach until fired on November 26, 2007
 John Bond – Offensive Coordinator/Quarterbacks
 Joe D'Alessandris – Offensive Line
 Buddy geis – Wide Receivers/Assistant Head Coach
 Jeep hunter – Tight Ends
 Brian jean-mary – Linebackers
 Charles kelly – Special Teams Coordinator
 Curtis modkins – Running Backs
 Giff smith – Defensive Line/Recruiting Coordinator
 Jon Tenuta – Assistant Head Coach/Defensive Coordinator
 Butch brooks – Director of Football Operations
 Liam klein – Director of Player Personnel

References

Georgia Tech
Georgia Tech Yellow Jackets football seasons
Georgia Tech Yellow Jackets football